Sandra Gouverneur (born October 2, 1976 in Heerhugowaard, North Holland) is a Dutch softball player, who represents the Dutch national team in international competitions.

Gouverneur played for The Herons, Terrasvogels, Nuoro and since 2007 for Gryphons. She plays as a shortstop and first baseman, while she bats and throws right-handed. She competes for the Dutch national team since 1995. In 2000 and 2001 she was named MVP in the Dutch Softball Hoofdklasse; in 2005 she was the best batter in the league. She is part of the Dutch team for the 2008 Summer Olympics in Beijing.

External links
 Gouverneur at dutchsoftballteam.com

References

1976 births
Living people
People from Heerhugowaard
Dutch softball players
Olympic softball players of the Netherlands
Softball players at the 2008 Summer Olympics
Sportspeople from North Holland
20th-century Dutch women